Muddy Creek may refer to:

Colorado 
Muddy Creek (Colorado), a tributary of the Colorado River

Iowa 
Muddy Creek (Iowa River tributary), a stream

Missouri 
Muddy Creek (Cass County, Missouri), a tributary of the Grand River
Muddy Creek (Daviess County, Missouri), a tributary of the Grand River
Muddy Creek (Grand River tributary Livingston County, Missouri), a tributary of the Grand River
Muddy Creek (Lamine River tributary), a stream
Muddy Creek (Nodaway River tributary), a stream

North Carolina 
Muddy Creek (Deep River tributary), a stream in Randolph and Guilford Counties

Ohio 
Muddy Creek (Little Miami River tributary), a stream

Oregon 
Muddy Creek (Oregon), several bodies of water, including:
Muddy Creek (Linn County, Oregon), a tributary of the Willamette River
Muddy Creek Reservoir or Junipers Reservoir, in Lake County

Pennsylvania 
Muddy Creek (Conestoga River tributary), a stream
Muddy Creek (French Creek tributary), a stream
Muddy Creek (Slippery Rock Creek tributary), a stream
Muddy Creek (Susquehanna River tributary), a stream

Utah 
 Muddy Creek (central Utah), a tributary of the Dirty Devil River

See also
Muddy Creek Airport (disambiguation)
Muddy River (disambiguation)
Muddy Run (disambiguation)
Muddy (disambiguation)